Emperor Xuan is the name of:

 Emperor Xuan of Han (91 BC–48 BC), Chinese emperor of the Han Dynasty.
 Emperor Xuan of Jin (179–251), posthumous title bestowed upon the Cao Wei statesman, general, and regent Sima Yi.  
 Emperor Xuan of Western Liang (519–562), Chinese emperor of the Liang Dynasty.
 Emperor Xuan of Chen (530–582), Chinese emperor of the Chen Dynasty.
 Emperor Xuan of Northern Zhou (559–580), second last emperor of Northern Zhou.

See also
King Xuan (disambiguation)
Emperor Xuanzong (disambiguation)